"Shadowland" was released as the first official single from Simple Minds founding member and vocalist Jim Kerr's first solo album Lostboy! AKA Jim Kerr in early 2010. The song was written during Simple Minds' 2009 tour for the album Graffiti Soul. Although being the first single, "Shadowland" was the second track to be heard from the Lostboy! album, as "Refugee" had premiered on radio a week earlier. "Shadowland" received its world premiere by Billy Sloan on his Sunday night radio show on March 14, 2010 and then appeared on the Lostboy! AKA  YouTube Channel the next day along with a remixed single version of the track.

The alternate remixed version, more suitable for radio airplay, was done by Cenzo Townshend who Kerr chose after Townshend's work on Simple Minds' "Rockets" and "Stars Will Lead The Way", which he had mixed into more radio friendly forms. A promotional single with the new radio mixes of the song was shipped to radio stations on April 4, 2010. "Shadowland" was originally meant to be released as a commercial physical release, but it was eventually only released as a download single, which was released on May 9, 2010. The three tracks on the download single were the same three tracks previously available on the "Shadowland" promo single.

Track list
Promo – CD-single EarMUSIC / Edel 0204645EREP – 05/04/2010
Shadowland – (Cenzo Townshend mix – radio edit) (3:31)
Shadowland – (Cenzo Townshend mix) – (4:25)
Refugee (Album Version) (4:08)

Download release EarMUSIC / Edel
Shadowland – (Cenzo Townshend mix – radio edit) (3:31)
shadowland – (Cenzo townshend mix) – (4:25)
Refugee (album version) – (4:08)

References

2010 singles
Simple Minds songs
Songs written by Jim Kerr
2010 songs
Edel AG singles